KDMD-LP, UHF analog channel 32, was a low-power Ion Television-affiliated television station licensed to Fairbanks, Alaska, United States. The station was owned by Ketchikan Television, LLC. It shared its call letters with its sister station in Anchorage, and was licensed as a translator of that station.

History
The station was issued a construction permit on September 23, 1992, for operation on channel 18 as K18ED; it was licensed in 1996. On April 27, 1999, the station was granted a permit to move to channel 32 as K32EB; however, on July 7, 2000, the call letters were changed to KDMD-LP. The move to channel 32 was completed in 2002. The KDMD-LP license was canceled on December 17, 2015.

References

Defunct television stations in the United States
DMD-LP
Television channels and stations established in 1996
Television channels and stations disestablished in 2015
1996 establishments in Alaska
2015 disestablishments in Alaska
DMD-LP